Michaël Guigou (born 28 January 1982) is a French former handball player for USAM Nîmes Gard and the French national team.

Regular member of the France national team, he was on the team that won the gold medal at two Olympics (2008 and 2012), four World championships (2009, 2011, 2015 and 2017) and three European championships (2006, 2010, 2014). During the final at the 2009 world championship, he was the highest scorer in one match with 10 goals (including 7 penalties out of 7) and finished as highest scorer of the French team with 52 goals.

In 2019, after 20 years in Montpellier Handball, he joined USAM Nîmes Gard. He ended his career in 2022.

Achievements

Club
EHF Champions League:
 Winner in 2003, 2018
EHF Cup:
 Runners up in 2014
French league (10): 2002, 2003, 2004, 2005, 2006, 2008, 2009, 2010, 2011, 2012
French cup (11): 2001, 2002, 2003, 2005, 2006, 2008, 2009, 2010, 2012, 2013, 2016
French league cup (10): 2004, 2005, 2006, 2007, 2008, 2010, 2011, 2012, 2014, 2016
French supercup: 2010, 2011, 2018

International
Olympics
 Gold: 2008, 2012, 2020
 Silver: 2016
World championship
 Gold: 2009, 2011, 2015, 2017
 Bronze: 2005, 2019
European championship
 Gold: 2006, 2010, 2014
 Bronze: 2018

Individual
All-Star Left wing of the World Championship: 2009
Best player of French league (11): 2003, 2004, 2005, 2006, 2007, 2009, 2010, 2011, 2014, 2015, 2018

See also
List of handballers with 1000 or more international goals

References

External links

French male handball players
Handball players at the 2004 Summer Olympics
Handball players at the 2008 Summer Olympics
Handball players at the 2012 Summer Olympics
Handball players at the 2016 Summer Olympics
Olympic handball players of France
Olympic gold medalists for France
Olympic silver medalists for France
Living people
1982 births
Olympic medalists in handball
Medalists at the 2008 Summer Olympics
Medalists at the 2012 Summer Olympics
Medalists at the 2016 Summer Olympics
European champions for France
Montpellier Handball players
Handball players at the 2020 Summer Olympics
Medalists at the 2020 Summer Olympics
21st-century French people